The Ireland cricket team toured the United Arab Emirates in January 2021 to play three One Day International (ODI) matches against Afghanistan. The ODI series formed part of the inaugural 2020–2023 ICC Cricket World Cup Super League. All of the matches were played at the Sheikh Zayed Cricket Stadium in Abu Dhabi.

The Afghanistan team's visa applications for travel to the UAE were delayed, resulting in the Afghanistan Cricket Board (ACB) making contingency plans for the series to be played in Oman. However, on 5 January 2021, the ACB confirmed that the team would be travelling to the UAE per the original schedule. The start of the series was moved back three days from the original schedule, due to the visa issues and a ten-day quarantine period in place in the UAE.

In the opening match, debutant Rahmanullah Gurbaz scored 127 runs to help Afghanistan win by 16 runs. In the second match, Rahmat Shah scored a century, with Afghanistan winning by seven wickets to take an unassailable lead in the series. Afghanistan won the third ODI by 36 runs, to win the series 3–0.

Squads

David Delany was ruled out of the series due to a knee injury, with Josh Little joining Ireland's squad. Little was originally named in the team, but had to self-isolate after a positive COVID-19 result from a close contact. Rashid Khan, Mohammad Nabi and Mujeeb Ur Rahman were all playing in the Big Bash League in Australia, before leaving the tournament to join the rest of the Afghanistan squad. On 11 January 2021, Shane Getkate was added to Ireland's squad, as a replacement for David Delany, and Conor Olphert was added to their squad as a net bowler.

Tour match
Ahead of the ODI series, the two teams played in unofficial warm-up match, with Afghanistan winning by 23 runs.

ODI series

1st ODI

2nd ODI

3rd ODI

References

External links
 Series home at ESPN Cricinfo

2021 in Afghan cricket
2021 in Irish cricket
International cricket competitions in 2020–21
Afghan cricket tours of the United Arab Emirates
Irish cricket tours of the United Arab Emirates